Haeju Airport is an airport located in Haeju, South Hwanghae, North Korea. Haeju Airport is controlled by the Korean People's Army. The airport mainly operates military flights but also has a limited number of civilian flights. This airport is notorious to South Korean intelligence authorities, because former North Korean Intelligence agents frequently use it as a transfer point .  The single runway 12/30 is 6562x289 ft (2000x88 m).

History
In the period from June 1946 to November 1948 it was used as a base for parts of the 250th Fighter Division. During the Korean War, the US Army designated as K-19.
During the Korean War the USAF designated the airfield as K-19.

Airlines and destinations

References 

Airports in North Korea
Korean War air bases